Fletcher Norton, 1st Baron Grantley, PC (23 June 1716 – 1 January 1789) was an English lawyer and politician who sat in the House of Commons from 1756 to 1782 when he was raised to the peerage as Baron Grantley.

Life and career

Norton was the eldest son of Thomas Norton of Grantley, Yorkshire. He was educated at St John's College, Cambridge and the Middle Temple, being called to the bar in 1739. After a period of inactivity, he built up a profitable practice, becoming a King's Counsel in 1754, and later attorney-general for the county palatine of Lancaster.

With his father he ordered the building in the mid-1700s of Grantley Hall, near Ripon in North Yorkshire.

In 1756, Norton was elected Member of Parliament for Appleby; he represented Wigan from 1761 to 1768, and was appointed solicitor-general for England and knighted in 1762. He took part in the proceedings against John Wilkes, and, having become Attorney General for England and Wales in 1763, prosecuted William Byron, 5th Baron Byron, for the murder of William Chaworth.  However, he lost his office when the Marquess of Rockingham came to power in July 1765.

In 1769, as MP for Guildford, Norton became a privy councillor and chief Justice in Eyre of the forests south of the Trent, and in 1770 was elected Speaker of the House of Commons. In 1777, when presenting the bill for the increase of the civil list to the king, he told George III that "parliament has not only granted to your majesty a large present supply, but also a very great additional revenue; great beyond example; great beyond your majesty's highest expense." This speech aroused general attention and caused some irritation; but the Speaker was supported by Charles James Fox and by the city of London, and received the thanks of the House of Commons.

The king did not forget these plain words, and after the general election of 1780, the prime minister, Lord North, and his followers declined to support the re-election of the retiring Speaker, alleging that his health was not equal to the duties of the office, and he was defeated when the voting took place. In 1782 he was made a peer as Baron Grantley of Markenfield in the County of York.

He was elected a Fellow of the Royal Society in 1776.

Death
He died in 1789 at his London home in Lincoln's Inn Fields and was buried at Wonersh, Surrey. In 1741 he had married Grace, the daughter and heiress of Sir William Chapple, Justice of the King's Bench, 1737–1745. They had 5 sons and 2 daughters. He was succeeded as Baron Grantley by his eldest son William (1742–1822).

Nathaniel William Wraxall described Norton as a bold, able and eloquent, but not a popular pleader, and as Speaker he was aggressive and indiscreet. Derided by satirists as "Sir Bullface Doublefee," and described by Horace Walpole as one who rose from obscure infamy to that infamous fame which will long stick to him, his character was also assailed by "Junius".

Family
Grantley married Grace Chapple, daughter and heir of Sir William Chapple, Justice of the King's bench, on 21 May 1741. They had four sons and a daughter:
William Norton, 2nd Baron Grantley (1742–1822)
Hon. Fletcher Norton MP FRSE (1744–1820); father of Hon. Charles Francis Norton and Hon. George Chapple Norton
Hon. Chapple Norton (1746–1818) 
Hon. Edward Norton (1750–1786)
Hon. Grace Norton (1752–1813), married John Wallop, 3rd Earl of Portsmouth

Arms

See also

 Baron Grantley

References

Horace Walpole, Memoirs of the Reign of George III., edited by G. F. R. Barker (1894); 
Sir N. W. Wraxall, Historical and Posthumous Memoirs, edited by H. B. Wheatley (1884); 
J. A. Manning, Lives of the Speakers (1850);
Hammond Innes, The Last Voyage:  Captain Cook's Lost Diary, (N.Y.:  Knopf, 1978).

Attribution:
 

1716 births
1789 deaths
People from the Borough of Harrogate
Alumni of St John's College, Cambridge
Members of the Middle Temple
Attorneys General for England and Wales
Peers of Great Britain created by George III
Knights Bachelor
Solicitors General for England and Wales
Norton, Fletcher
Norton, Fletcher
Norton, Fletcher
Norton, Fletcher
Norton, Fletcher
Norton, Fletcher
Norton, Fletcher
Politics of the Metropolitan Borough of Wigan
Fellows of the Royal Society
Fletcher 1